Philippe Baby Casgrain (December 30, 1826 – May 23, 1917) was a Quebec lawyer, author and political figure. He represented L'Islet in the House of Commons of Canada as a Liberal member from 1873 to 1891.

He was born in Quebec City in 1826, the son of Charles-Eusèbe Casgrain, and studied at the College of Ste. Anne de la Pocatière. He articled in law with Jean-Thomas Taschereau, was called to the bar in 1850 and practiced at Quebec with Pierre Joseph Olivier Chauveau. In 1854, he married Mathilde Perrault. He was named deputy prothonotary for the Quebec Superior Court in Quebec district. Casgrain was named Queen's Counsel in 1879. After he retired from politics, he was clerk for the Quebec Circuit and Revision Court. He served several terms as president of the Literary and Historical Society of Quebec.

Casgrain published a number of works on the history of Canada, including:
Letellier de Saint-Just et son temps (1895)
La vie de Joseph-François Perrault, surnommé le père de l'éducation du peuple canadien (1898)
La fontaine d'Abraham Martin et le site de son habitation (1903)
La maison d'Arnoux où Montcalm est mort (1903)
La maison du Chien d'Or à Québec (1905)
Les batailles des plaines d'Abraham et de Sainte-Foye (1908)
La chapelle et le tombeau de Champlain (1909)

He died at Quebec in 1917.

His son Joseph Philippe Baby became a member of the Canadian Senate.

Electoral record

External links
 
Fils de Québec, quatrième série, P-G Roy (1933)
 'L’Encyclopédie de l’histoire du Québec''

Beaubien-Casgrain family
Baby family (Canada)
1826 births
1917 deaths
Members of the House of Commons of Canada from Quebec
Liberal Party of Canada MPs
20th-century Canadian historians
Canadian male non-fiction writers
Canadian King's Counsel
Politicians from Quebec City
Writers from Quebec City
19th-century Canadian historians